Events from the year 1726 in Ireland.

Incumbent
Monarch: George I

Events
October 27 – Rev. Dr. Caleb Threlkeld publishes Synopsis Stirpium Hibernicarum .....Dispositarum sive Commentatio de Plantis Indigenis praesertim Dublinensibus instituta in Dublin, the first flora of Ireland.

Arts and literature
October 26 – Jonathan Swift's Gulliver's Travels is published in London

Births

April – Thomas Browne, 4th Viscount Kenmare, landowner and politician (d. 1795)
May 20 – John Browne, 1st Baron Kilmaine, politician (d. 1794)
Full date unknown
Isaac Barré, soldier and politician (d. 1802)
Dorcas Blackwood, 1st Baroness Dufferin and Claneboye (d. 1807)
Sir Eyre Coote, KB, soldier (d. 1783)

Deaths
May 20 – Nicholas Brady, Anglican divine and poet (b. 1659)
Sean na Sagart, priest hunter in Penal Times (b. c1690)
Bryan Townsend (Irish politician)

References

 
Years of the 18th century in Ireland
Ireland
1720s in Ireland